Shiho (written: , , , , ,  or ) is a feminine Japanese given name. Notable people with the name include:

, Japanese actress and model
, Japanese actress
, Japanese ice hockey player
, Japanese photojournalist
, Japanese tennis player
, Japanese idol
, Japanese voice actress and singer
, Japanese voice actress
Shiho Kokido, a Japanese voice actress
, Japanese speed skater
, Japanese snowboarder 
, Japanese voice actress
, Japanese fencer
, Japanese musician 
, Japanese swimmer
, Japanese manga artist
, Japanese badminton player
, Japanese judoka
, Japanese model

Fictional characters
, a character in the anime series My-HiME
, a character in the manga series Detective Conan
, a character from the video game Hatsune Miku: Colorful Stage!
, a character in the manga series Zettai Karen Children
, a character in the video game Persona 5

Shiho Ichimura from Odd Taxi

Shiho Kariya

Japanese feminine given names